Night Kitchen Radio Theater is a radio theater company founded and directed by Arthur Yorinks.  It has produced two dramatic radio programs: "Live From The Kennedy Center", featuring original radio plays and adaptations for family audiences;  and "@7 The Henry Street Series", radio adaptations of classic literature.  Both series are taped before live audiences and broadcast on XM Satellite Radio. It now performs live at The New Victory Theater on Broadway in New York City. In addition, it produces new audio content which can be downloaded from spokenwordamerica.com. It has created a new theatrical audio version of A Christmas Carol, written and directed by Arthur Yorinks starring Peter Gerety along with other Broadway performers.

Series episodes:

For "Live from the Kennedy Center":  The Emperor's New Clothes, Seek, The Nose, The End of the Beginning, Pinocchio, Harry and Lulu, The Magician’s Boy, The Fisherman and His Wife, Sherlock Holmes, Clever Bill, Hey, Al, Bad Boy, and Christmas in July/The Flying Latke
For "@7 The Henry Street Series":  Aristophanes' Lysistrata, Kafka's The Metamorphosis, Dickens' Bleak House, Abrons' Three Travelers, and Gogol's The Portrait

Casts for Night Kitchen Radio Theater productions have included Alice Playten, Richard Muenz, Debra Winger, Steven Rattazzi, Arliss Howard, Karen Kandel, Anthony Arkin, Robert Reames, Anthony Zaccaro, Michelle Esrick, and Ivy Austin.  Scripts by Arthur Yorinks, Richard Abrons, Paul Fleishman, and Walter Dean Myers.  Music by Edward Barnes.  All episodes directed by Arthur Yorinks

External links
 Night Kitchen Radio Theater
 Spoken Word America

American radio dramas